is a Japanese footballer who plays as a left-back for Shibuya City FC. He managed the club during the 2022 season.

Career

Nagoya Grampus
Abe started his professional career with Nagoya Grampus in the 2006 season. In his first season, he made twelve appearances in all competitions. He spent eight years with the Prefecture club, making 226 league appearances, along with winning the J1 League and Emperor's Cup. However, in his time with the club, he only scored once. That came in the 2008 Emperor's Cup.

Ventforet Kofu
In January 2014, Abe transferred to Ventforet Kofu on a free transfer. He spent two seasons with the club, making 75 appearances in all competitions and scoring twice.

JEF United Chiba
In January 2016, Abe was sold to JEF United Chiba. In his only season playing with them, he made 34 appearances in all competitions, scoring once.

Return to Ventforet Kofu
In March 2017, Abe was loaned out to his former club, Ventforet Kofu. He made 24 league appearances with Kofu before his loan expired on 31 January 2018. He completed his transfer to Ventforet a day later.

Tokyo City FC
On 18 February 2019 it was announced, that Abe had joined Tokyo City FC.

Managerial career
On 1 December 2021, Abe was announcement officially appointment manager of Shibuya City FC (previously Tokyo City FC) from 2022 season.

Club statistics
Updated to the end 2019 season.

Honours
Nagoya Grampus
J1 League: 2010
Japanese Super Cup: 2011

References

External links 
Profile at Ventforet Kofu
 Profile at Nagoya Grampus

 Shohei Abe official blog
 

1983 births
Living people
University of Tsukuba alumni
Association football people from Chiba Prefecture
Japanese footballers
J1 League players
J2 League players
Nagoya Grampus players
Ventforet Kofu players
JEF United Chiba players
Association football defenders
Association football managers